Sophia Miaouli (born January 18, 1970 in Nicosia) is a Cypriot sport shooter. She competed at the 2000 Summer Olympics in the women's skeet event, in which she tied for ninth place.

References

1970 births
Living people
Skeet shooters
Cypriot female sport shooters
Shooters at the 2000 Summer Olympics
Olympic shooters of Cyprus